The following is a list of events relating to television in Ireland from 1981.

Events

April – The Working Party on Women in Broadcasting presents its report to the RTÉ Authority.
4 April – Ireland hosts the Eurovision Song Contest from the RDS Simmonscourt Pavilion, Dublin, after winning the previous year. The contest is won by the United Kingdom with the song Making Your Mind Up, performed by the group Bucks Fizz.
17 June – RTÉ broadcast seventeen continuous hours of coverage of the 1981 General Election.
30 June – Patrick Cooney is appointed Minister for Posts and Telegraphs.
11 November – RTÉ Television begins airing the Irish language adult education programme Anois 's Arís.
Undated – RTÉ is given special government permission to broadcast two television programmes that are part of a series jointly produced with the BBC titled The Troubles. The programmes include interviews with organisations banned from the media by Section 31 of the Broadcasting Authority Act.
Undated – 1981 is thought to be the air date of Channel D, a pirate television station in Dublin.

Debuts

RTÉ 1
14 January –  Brendon Chase (1980)
20 March –  Dennis the Menace (1959–1963)
7 October –  3-2-1 Contact (1980–1988)

RTÉ 2
15 May –  Palmerstown, U.S.A. (1980–1981)

Ongoing television programmes

1960s
RTÉ News: Nine O'Clock (1961–present)
RTÉ News: Six One (1962–present)
The Late Late Show (1962–present)
Wanderly Wagon (1967–1982)

1970s
Sports Stadium (1973–1997)
Trom agus Éadrom (1975–1985)
The Late Late Toy Show (1975–present)
RTÉ News on Two (1978–2014)
The Live Mike (1979–1982)
Bosco (1979–1996)
The Sunday Game (1979–present)

1980s
Bracken (1980–1982)

Ending this year
Undated – Quicksilver (1965–1981)

Births
26 January – Colin O'Donoghue, film, television and theatre actor
8 March – Glenda Gilson, model and television presenter

See also
1981 in Ireland

References

 
1980s in Irish television